Time is a musical with a book and lyrics by Dave Clark and David Soames, music by Jeff Daniels, and additional songs by Hans Poulsen and David Pomeranz.

Plot
Derived from the 1970s musical The Time Lord by Soames and Daniels, it focuses on contemporary rock musician Chris Wilder, who has been transported with his backup singers and band from a concert to the High Court of the Universe in the Andromeda Galaxy. In light of mankind's strides in space exploration, the Time Lord Melchisedic (loosely based on the title character in the BBC science fiction series Doctor Who) has decided the time has come to examine Earth's people to determine what role they will play in the quest for universal peace, and Wilder and his band are called upon to defend their planet.

Productions
The heavily amplified multi-media event relied heavily on special effects, including a huge projected floating head named Akash (billed by the show's producers as a hologram) that served as a narrator throughout the show. The interior of the Dominion Theatre in London, where the show first ran, was gutted and reconstructed to accommodate the massive steel set with hydraulic lift designed by John Napier.

The West End production, directed and choreographed by Larry Fuller (assisted by Arlene Phillips), had a world premiere on April 9, 1986, at the Dominion Theatre in London, where it ran for two years. Cliff Richard starred as Wilder, Jodie Brooke Wilson as Louise, Jeff Shankley as Melchisedic, and Dilys Watling as one of the tribunal judges, with a pre-filmed Laurence Olivier as Akash. David Cassidy replaced Richard later in the run, closing with Grease producer David Ian. Stephanie Lawrence was also a replacement in the Time musical and played opposite Cassidy.

Cast

 The Rock Star, Chris Wilder - Cliff Richard (Later replaced by David Cassidy)
 Louise - Jodie Brooke Wilson (Later replaced by Stephanie Lawrence)
 Babs - Dawn Hope
 Carol Ann - Maria Ventura
 The Rock Group - Cavin Cornwall, Neil Gow-Hunter, Simon Shelton, Ian Stewart
 Akash, The Ultimate Word in Truth - Laurence Olivier
 Judge Morgua - Dilys Watling
 Judge Trigon - John North
 Judge Lagus - David Timson
 Lord Melchisedic, The Time Lord - Jeff Shankley
 Lord Melchisedic's Retinue - Gary Co-Burn, Brad Graham (left due to injury) Neil Gow-Hunter, Kazimir Kolesnik, Alan Meggs, Dave Trevors, Steve Mondey, Simon Shelton, Simon Marlow, Neil Reynolds
 Captain Ebony - Clinton Derricks-Carroll
 Captain Ebony's Retinue - Heather Robbins, Linda Mae Brewer, Rosemary Ford, Robin Clever, Ian Stewart and Sparky (Later replaced by Kim Rosato, Stacey Haynes, Sandra Easby, Annabel Haydn, Ian Stewart, Cavin Cornwall)

Recording

A concept album was released by Capitol Records in the United States and EMI elsewhere in the world (UK Catalogue Number UK:AMPM 1 (EQ 5003).

In addition to Richard and Olivier, it featured Freddie Mercury, Julian Lennon, Murray Head, Dionne Warwick, Leo Sayer, Ashford & Simpson, Stevie Wonder, John Christie, Jimmy Helms, Mike Moran, and Paul Miles-Kingston. Olivier's spoken "Theme From 'Time was released as a single in some countries and was a surprise hit on the Australian charts, reaching #27.

25th anniversary release 
The album was never released on CD but in 2012 Time - The Musical was made available for digital download from iTunes. It featured both acts of the show, the 13 single releases, new edits and several alternate mixes not on the original vinyl record or cassette release. The recordings were restored and remastered by Adam Vanryne and produced by Dave Clark. The re-release was timed to commemorate the musical's 25th anniversary. A 20-page color booklet accompanied the album.

Song list

Act I
 Born to Rock 'n Roll
 Time Talkin'
 Time
 Music of the Spheres
 Law of the Universe
 The Time Lord Theme
 The Charge
 One Human Family
 What On Earth (moved to here from second song of Act II at cast change in 1987)
 I Know, I Know
 Your Brother in Soul
 Case for the Prosecution
 Starmaker
 Time Will Teach Us All
 I Object
 In My Defence

Act II
 Within My World (added to opening of Act II at cast change in 1987)
 Because I Love You
 Move the Judge
 What on Earth (removed from Act II in 1987)
 She's So Beautiful
 If You Only Knew
 We're the UFO
 The Theme from Time
 Harmony
 The Return
 Time (Reprise)
 It's in Everyone of Us

Critical reception
"If present trends go on, John Napier and his team will doubtless one day find themselves re-creating the entire state of Iowa for a rock musical about the Little Red Hen, or reconstructing the Alps for one about Heidi; but until then Time can claim it has provided the most sensational contrast between mountainous spectacle and molehill content the musical theatergoer has seen."

"It's like a science-fiction Sunday-school lesson. London critics had a field day sneering at its greeting-card philosophy and 1960s flower-power platitudes. But children, the young at heart, tourists with little English and any lover of sheer spectacle will be enraptured."

"But its actual genius is the man who invented its gravity-defying, sense-bombarding scenic effects, the modern theater's most astounding designer. His name is John Napier."

"The worst of it, though, are the philosophical speeches from The Time Lord who sounds like Captain Highliner after transcendental meditation. If vinyl ever deserved to be melted..."

See also
 Time (Freddie Mercury song)

References

External links
 The Official Time - The Album website
 Fan website
 Time - The Musical Fansite

1986 musicals
Holography in fiction
West End musicals
British musicals
Science fiction musicals